Salih Hudayar (born 21 May 1993) is a Uyghur American politician known for advocating for East Turkistan independence. He founded the East Turkistan National Awakening Movement and has since been leading the movement calling for the "restoration of East Turkistan's independence."

On November 11, 2019, Hudayar was elected as the Prime Minister of the East Turkistan Government-in-Exile. Hudayar was born in Atush, East Turkistan (Xinjiang) and studied International Studies and Political Science at the University of Oklahoma and holds American citizenship.

Early life and education
Hudayar was born to a Uyghur business family in Atush in 1993. At the age of 7, Hudayar came to the United States with his family as political refugees. He grew up in Oklahoma and joined the Oklahoma Army National Guard while enrolled in the ROTC program in hopes of becoming a military officer, he was later given a medical discharge due to a kidney condition. Hudayar studied International Studies & Political Science at the University of Oklahoma, graduating in January 2017.

East Turkistan National Awakening Movement
In the summer of 2017, Hudayar founded the East Turkistan National Awakening Movement and moved from Oklahoma to Washington, DC to engage in human rights and political advocacy. He is widely known as the Founder and President of the East Turkistan National Awakening Movement. In early 2018, Hudayar began to meet with members of Congress and advocate for the Uyghur Human Rights Policy Act and since June 4, 2018, he has led weekly demonstrations in front of the US Capitol building and the White House to protest China's policy in Xinjiang.

Calling for East Turkistan's Independence

With the official public launching of the East Turkistan National Awakening Movement on June 4, 2018, Hudayar has been leading a global movement openly advocating for the "restoration of East Turkistan's independence." In September 2019, launched a petition to the White House which got over 108,000 signatures, calling on the US Government to "prevent a 21st century Holocaust in East Turkistan" and "recognize East Turkistan as an Occupied country." On November 13, 2018, Salih Hudayar led hundreds of Uyghurs from the White House to the US Capitol in commemoration of the 85th Anniversary of the First East Turkistan Republic and the 74th Anniversary of the Second East Turkistan Republic's declaration of independence. The demonstrators called on the US Congress to pass a Uyghur Act and called for "freedom and independence for East Turkistan." Despite calls for independence being viewed as "controversial" by other Uyghur groups like the Uyghur American Association, Uyghur Human Rights Project, and the World Uyghur Congress, Hudayar has repeatedly stated that, "the only way we [Uyghurs] can ensure our freedoms and human rights is by restoring our independence [independence of East Turkistan] and that’s the only way we can ensure our overall survival as a whole." In an interview with the Middle East Eye, Hudayar stated that Uyghurs want the United States to understand that the Uyghurs are an occupied people and that the majority of them believe that restoring East Turkistan's independence is the only way forward.

On April 9, 2019, Salih Hudayar delivered a speech calling on the "free world" to support the separatist movement at the newly launched Committee on the Present Danger China Roundtable. A month later, in May 2019, Hudayar was invited by Frank Gaffney to speak about China's persecution of Uyghur and other Turkic peoples at an event hosted by Save the Persecuted Christians.

In July 2019, the East Turkistan National Awakening Movement published 124 coordinates of "suspected concentration camps" in East Turkistan, Hudayar told the Washington Free Beacon that ETNAM wanted the world to know about these locations as they feared "China might be preparing for a 21st Century Holocaust." In October 2019, the Agence France-Presse (AFP) interviewed Salih Hudayar regarding China's destruction of Uyghur graves and cultural sites. Hudayar told the AFP that China was destroying historical sites and cemeteries to disconnect Uyghurs from their history and their ancestors and "eradicate any evidence" of who the Uyghurs are. In November 2019, Hudayar attended a pro-Hong Kong rally in Washington, DC where he told Voice of America that "Uyghurs stand with the people of Hong Kong, and if Hong Kong falls then Hong Kong face the same situation we are going through."

Advocating for recognition of the Uyghur Genocide

Hudayar spent numerous years extensively advocating for official recognition of the Uyghur genocide by the U.S., EU, United Nations, and countries around the world and even referred to it as a "21st century Holocaust". On July 6, 2020, the East Turkistan Government in Exile and the East Turkistan National Awakening Movement under Hudayar's leadership filed a formal legal complaint at the International Criminal Court against Chinese officials for genocide and other crimes against humanity against Uyghurs and other Turkic peoples. In October 2020, Hudayar persuaded members of the U.S. Senate to introduce a resolution to designate China's human rights abuses against Uyghurs as genocide. During the last weeks of the Trump Administration, he thanked sent a letter thanking the U.S. Government and the Trump Administration for "everything they have done for East Turkistan and its people and urging Secretary Pompeo to "seal his legacy" by formally recognizing the Uyghur genocide. On January, 19, 2021, U.S. Secretary of State Mike Pompeo declared that China was committing an "ongoing" genocide against Uyghurs. Before the U.S. Secretary of State Mike Pompeo's official designation of China's actions against Uyghurs as genocide on January 19, 2021, the East Turkistan Government in Exile and the East Turkistan National Awakening Movement, both led by Hudayar, were the only Uyghur groups to have publicly advocated for recognition of the Uyghur genocide.

East Turkistan Government-in-Exile
Following Hudayar's speech at the Committee on the Present Danger, the self-proclaimed East Turkistan Government-in-Exile appointed Salih Hudayar as their Ambassador to the United States. As Ambassador, Hudayar continued to advocate for Uyghurs' human rights and East Turkistan independence. In an interview, Hudayar claimed to Fox News that China was harvesting the organs of Uyghurs. On November 11, 2019, Hudayar was elected as Prime Minister of the East Turkistan Government-in-Exile at the 8th General Assembly of the East Turkistan Government-in-Exile. The next day, the East Turkistan National Awakening Movement held a press conference where they released nearly 500 coordinates of alleged concentration camps, prisons, and labor camps. Later that afternoon, Hudayar led a demonstration to commemorate the independence of the former East Turkistan Republics and to bring attention to what he described as a genocide of Uyghurs and other Turkic peoples. In an interview with NPR, Hudayar stated that Uyghurs and other Turkic peoples in East Turkistan want independence, he also stated that East Turkistan Government in Exile doesn't consider themselves as "separatists" because they believe that, "you can't separate from something you don't belong to."

In March 2020, Salih Hudayar led an East Turkistan delegation and held meetings with numerous Senators and Representatives. During his meeting with Representative Ted Yoho, Hudayar asked him to deliver a speech on East Turkistan at the US House of Representatives. Congressman Ted Yoho described East Turkistan as an "occupied country" and condemned China for its alleged genocide of Uyghurs, Kazakhs, Kyrgyz and other Turkic peoples. Hudayar condemned the "slave labor" of Uyghurs and other Turkic peoples and accused China of colonizing East Turkistan and enslaving the Uyghurs and other Turkic peoples. In April 2020, Hudayar appeared as a special guest on Steve Bannon's War Room Pandemic and criticized Muslim countries and leaders for remaining silent on China's alleged atrocities against Turkic Muslims in Xinjiang.

ICC Case

On July 6, 2020, the East Turkistan Government in Exile (ETGE) and the East Turkistan National Awakening Movement filed a complaint urging the International Criminal Court (ICC) to investigate and prosecute Chinese officials for genocide and crimes against humanity. Salih Hudayar told Radio Free Asia's Chinese service that "for too long we have been oppressed by China and its Communist Party and we have suffered so much that the genocide of our people can be no longer ignored." On July 9, 2020, the US Government sanctioned 3 senior Chinese officials including Xinjiang Party Secretary Chen Quanguo and Zhu Hailun who were among the 30 officials mentioned in the complaint to the ICC. Hudayar told Radio Free Asia that the East Turkistan Government in Exile welcomed the sanctions and that Uyghurs wanted real justice. He stated that the Chinese officials should be put on trial like the Nazis during the Nuremberg Trials.

Personal life
Salih Hudayar is fluent in English, Uyghur and Turkish.

See also 
 East Turkistan Independence Movement
 East Turkistan National Awakening Movement
 East Turkistan Government-in-Exile

References

External links 
Salih Hudayar Speaks at 'Committee on the Present Danger: China' Event hosted by the Center for Security Policy

1993 births
American anti-communists
American people of Uyghur descent
East Turkestan independence activists
Living people
Uyghur activists
Uyghur people
Uyghur politicians